The Ord Mountains are located in the Mojave Desert of southern California, USA. The Ord Mountains lie directly north of the Lucerne Valley and the San Bernardino Mountains.

References

Mountain ranges of Southern California
Mountain ranges of the Mojave Desert
Mountain ranges of San Bernardino County, California